Medinilla waterhousei, commonly known as tagimaucia or tagimoucia (tahng-ee-mow-theea), is a species of flowering plant in the family Melastomataceae which is endemic to the highland rainforest of the Fijian island of Taveuni.  It is a liana bearing crimson and white flowers in 30 cm-long hanging clusters.  It only grows at altitudes of over 600 m, flowering from October to December. The flower is the floral emblem of Fiji. The flower is now represented on the Fiji $50 note replacing the queen.

Legend
A local romantic legend attached to the flower has it representing the tears of a young girl forbidden by her father to marry the boy of her dreams so as she wept her tears became the flower.

Etymology
Medinilla is named for José de Medinilla y Pineda, who was governor of Mauritius (then known as the Marianne Islands) in 1820.

References

External links
 A journey to Earth's most remote flower – BBC Travel

Endemic flora of Fiji
waterhousei
Vines
National symbols of Fiji
Taveuni
Taxa named by Berthold Carl Seemann
Plants described in 1866